The Features, Vol. 1 is the first compilation album by rapper Suga Free, it was released on August 22, 2006. The album features songs that Suga Free has appeared on throughout the 1998-2006.

Track listing

Disc 1

Disc 2

References

External links
http://www.discogs.com/Suga-Free-The-Features/release/2089092
http://www.amazon.com/The-Features-V-1-Explicit/dp/B000S5AQ6U/ref=sr_1_18?ie=UTF8&qid=1323636261&sr=8-18

2006 compilation albums
Suga Free albums
Albums produced by Battlecat (producer)
Albums produced by DJ Quik
Albums produced by G-One
Albums produced by JellyRoll
Albums produced by Bosko
Albums produced by L.T. Hutton